Bruton v. United States, 391 U.S. 123 (1968), is a 1968 United States Supreme Court ruling in which the Court held that a defendant was deprived of his rights under the Confrontation Clause if a confession by his codefendant was introduced in their joint trial, regardless of whether the jury received instructions only to consider it against the confessor. This has become known as the Bruton rule. The case  overruled Delli Paoli v. United States (1957).

Reasoning
As the basis for its holding, the Supreme Court stated that "There are some contexts in which the risk that the jury will not, or cannot, follow instructions is so great, and the consequences of failure so vital to the defendant, that the practical and human limitations of the jury system cannot be ignored. Such a context is presented here, where the powerfully incriminating extrajudicial statements of a codefendant, who stands accused side-by-side with the defendant, are deliberately spread before the jury in a joint trial. Not only are the incriminations devastating to the defendant but their credibility is inevitably suspect . . . . The unreliability of such evidence is intolerably compounded when the alleged accomplice, as here, does not testify and cannot be tested by cross-examination."

See also
Cruz v. New York (1987)

References

External links
 
 

1968 in United States case law
Confrontation Clause case law
United States Supreme Court cases
United States Supreme Court cases of the Warren Court